Bewoor  is a village in the Yelburga taluk of Koppal district in the Indian state of Karnataka.
Bewoor is 27 km from District Headquarters Koppal and lies on Koppal-Kushtagi road. Bewoor contributed many heroes for freedom fighter of India.

Demographics
As of 2001 India census, Bewoor had a population of 4,207 with 2,170 males and 2,127 females and 722 Households.

See also 
Hospet
Munirabad
Hampi
Koppal
Karnataka

References

Villages in Koppal district